The Bavarian Prealps are a mountain range within the Northern Limestone Alps in south Germany. The term is not defined politically, but alpine-geographically because small areas of the Bavarian Prealps lie in Tyrol (e.g. the Hinteres Sonnwendjoch south of the Rotwand).

The term is not to be confused with the Bavarian Alps or the Bavarian Alpine Foreland. These terms include the whole of the alpine region (together with parts of the Wetterstein, the Karwendel, etc.) and the whole Alpine Foreland on Bavarian state territory.

Except in the Ester Mountains in the extreme west, the summits of the Bavarian Prealps are all below 2000 metres in height and only a few have prominent limestone cliffs.

Extent 

According to the 1984 classification of the Eastern Alps by the German Alpine Club the Bavarian Prealps are delineated as follows: Prealp region from Murnau via Kochel am See, Bad Tölz to Rosenheim – Inn to Kiefersfelden – Kieferbach – Glemmbach – Ellbach – Kaiserhaus (in Brandenberg) – Brandenberger Ache – Erzherzog-Johann-Klause (at the Brandenberger Ache) – Sattelbach – Ampelsbach – Achenbach – Walchen – Isar to Krün – Kranzbach – Kankerbach – Garmisch-Partenkirchen – Loisach to Murnau.

Subdivision 
The westernmost part of the Bavarian Prealps is formed by the Ester Mountains and its highest peak, the Krottenkopf, which is also the highest summit in the Prealps. To the northeast the range is enclosed by the Herzogstand and Heimgarten and the long ridge of the Benediktenwand.
The eastern part of the Prealps between the rivers Isar and Inn is known as the Mangfall Mountains, because its streams – the Rottach, Weißach, Schlierach and Leitzach – all flow into the Mangfall river, which drains the whole area and forming an important groundwater store for the city of Munich.

Neighbouring mountain ranges 
The Bavarian Prealps border  the following mountain ranges in the Alps:
 Chiemgau Alps (to the east)
 Kaiser Mountains (to the southeast)
 Brandenberg Alps (to the south)
 Karwendel (to the south)
 Wetterstein mountains (to the southwest)
 Ammergau Alps (to the west)
To the north the Bavarian Prealps border on the Alpine Foreland.

Notable peaks 

 Benediktenwand
 Bischof
 Heimgarten
 Herzogstand
 Hinteres Sonnwendjoch
 Hirschberg
 Karwendel
 Krottenkopf
 Neureuth
 Plankenstein
 Rechelkopf
 Risserkogel
 Roßstein and Buchstein
 Rotwand
 Seekarkreuz

Tourism

Mountain climbing 
Many peaks in the Bavarian Prealps are part of Munich's Hausbergen ("home mountains") and may be climbed all year round on foot, by ski mountaineers or with snowshoes. There are good and simple, even family-friendly, routes to most of the summits. Several also offer scenic, generally well-protected climbing routes across a wide range of climbing grades (UIAA II to X): the Roßstein and Buchstein, Plankenstein (Direkter Ostgrat: IV+, Nadel Südwand: X), Ruchenköpfe (Münchner Riß: III, Dülfer Riß: IV). A ski touring classic is the Rotwand-Reib'n, which runs up to the Rotwand.

Long-distance hiking trails 
The Via Alpina, a cross-border long-distance trail with five route sections, runs over the entire Alps, including the Bavarian Prealps.

The Violette Way of the Via Alpina runs in 9 stages through the Bavarian Prealps as follows:
 Stage A51 runs from Oberaudorf to the Brünnsteinhaus
 Stage A52 runs from the Brünnsteinhaus to the Rotwandhaus via the Ursprungtal
 Stage A53 runs from the Rotwandhaus to Sutten via the Spitzingsee
 Stage A54 runs from Sutten to Kreuth via the Risserkogel
 Stage A55 runs from Kreuth to Lenggries via the Hirschberghütte and the Lenggrieser Hütte
 Stage A56 runs from Lenggries to the Tutzinger Hütte via the Brauneck
 Stage A57 runs from der Tutzinger Hütte to the Herzogstand via the Kesselberghöhe
 Stage A58 runs from the Herzogstand to the Weilheimer Hütte via Eschenlohe
 Stage A59 runs from der Weilheimer Hütte to Garmisch-Partenkirchen via the Wank

The Munich–Venice Dream Path (Traumpfad München–Venedig), first publicised in 1977, also runs through the Bavarian Prealps. Although it is not an official long-distance path, it has become well known because so many walking clubs and states were involved in its creation. The third section of the Dream Path runs from Geretsried to the Brauneck Gipfelhaus via Bad Tölz and Lenggries. Most of this stage is located in the Alpine Foreland. The fourth stage runs from the Brauneck-Gipfelhaus via the Benediktenwand in the Jachenau. The fifth stage runs from the Jachenau to Vorderriß, where the path enters the Karwendel. The end point is at Hinterriß.

In addition there is the Via Bavarica Tyrolensis, a  cycle path from Munich to the Tyrol (see main article).

Gallery

Sources 
German Alpine Club (DAV): Alpenvereins-Jahrbuch "Berg '84": Die Einteilung der Ostalpen
M. u. E. Zebhauser: Alpenvereinsführer Bayerische Voralpen Ost, Rother-Verlag, 1992, 
Bernd Ritschel/Malte Roeper: Bayerische Alpen zwischen Oberammergau und Bayrischzell with articles by Hermann Magerer, Michael Pause, Hans Steinbichler et al., 1st edn., 2001, Rother-Verlag,

External links 
 Tours and summits in the Bavarian Prealps at steinmandl.de 
 Large selection of walks in the Munich Hausbergen 
 Mountain tours & ski tours - many route descriptions from the Bavarian Prealps with photos 
 Description of numerous climbing routes 
 Description of numerous mountain tours 

 
Mountain ranges of the Alps
Northern Limestone Alps
Mountain ranges of Bavaria
Mountain ranges of Tyrol (state)